Fabio da Silva Lopes, commonly known as Fabio da Silva (born 9 January 1986), is a Portuguese rugby union football player. He plays as a Scrum-half.

He made his club debut in France where he played for Lyon from 2005 till 2008 where he signed for Villeurbanne for a season before moving to Saint-Étienne for 2 seasons. He currently plays for Bourgoin as of 2011 and has played 25 games for them scoring 4 tries.

References

1986 births
Living people
Portuguese rugby union players
Rugby union scrum-halves
Portuguese expatriate rugby union players
Expatriate rugby union players in France
CS Bourgoin-Jallieu players
Portuguese expatriate sportspeople in France